Manocherian Brothers and its sister company, Pan Am Equities, are companies owned by the Manocherian family that invest in real estate, primarily tenements on the Upper East Side of Manhattan in New York City.

Other buildings owned by the family include One Astor Place, 210 Fifth Avenue, 201 East 12th Street, Empire House (located at 200 East 71st Street), New York Tower at East 39th Street, the Caroline at 60 West 23rd Street, and New York Plaza at 2 Water Street. The family also owns the New York Health & Racquet Club. The family has also owned The Langham.

History

The company was founded by brothers Amir, Eskandar, and Fraydun Manocherian, who came from a well‐to‐do Iranian family and immigrated to the United States in the 1930s.

In 2012, a subsidiary of the company acquired the Bond Building in Washington, D.C. for $22 million.

References

Privately held companies of the United States
Real estate companies of the United States
Manocherian family
Family-owned companies of the United States